Jimmy Matlock (born February 5, 1959) is an American politician, business owner, and Republican member of the Tennessee House of Representatives for the 21st district, encompassing Lenoir City, and parts of Loudon County and Monroe County. He served from 2007 to 2019. He succeeded Russell Johnson. Matlock was succeeded by Lowell Russell.

Biography
Jimmy Matlock was born on February 5, 1959, in Loudon, Tennessee. He attended the Middle Tennessee State University and the University of Tennessee. He inherited a small business.

He is a boardmember of the Tellico Reservoir Development Agency, the Eaton Crossroads Ruritan Club, BB&T for the Tennessee region, the Loudon County United Way, the East Tennessee Church of the Nazarene Advisory Board. He is also a former chair of the Loudon County Republican Party, and a member of the Chambers of Commerce of Loudon County, McMinn County, Monroe County, and Blount County.

He is married with three children, and he is a Christian.
Matlock is the owner of Matlock Tire Corporation headquartered in Lenoir City, Tennessee. The American Conservative Union gave him a 93% evaluation in 2017.

References

External links
Project Vote Smart – Representative Jimmy Matlock (TN) profile

Living people
1959 births
Middle Tennessee State University alumni
University of Tennessee alumni
Republican Party members of the Tennessee House of Representatives
American members of the Church of the Nazarene
People from Loudon, Tennessee
21st-century American politicians
People from Lenoir City, Tennessee